Glin Castle is a Georgian country house and national heritage site located along the River Shannon in Glin, County Limerick, Ireland. The castle has belonged to the FitzMaurice/FitzGerald family for over 700 years and was the seat of the Knights of Glin.

History 
The FitzGeralds and Fitzmaurices first settled in the area in the 13th century, following the Anglo-Norman invasion of Ireland, at the nearby Shanid Castle.

Castle
In the 14th century the Lord of Desmond elevated an illegitimate son to the hereditary knighthood of Glin. He built Glin Castle within the village of Glin, which became the permanent seat of the Knight of Glin. The castle was attacked during the Desmond Rebellions in the 16th century, the Cromwellian conquest of Ireland in the 17th century, the Jacobite risings and the Enforcement of the Penal Laws. In 1601 the castle was besieged by British troops and the knight's son was kidnapped.

Georgian house
By the late 17th century the castle had been abandoned and the FitzGerald family moved into a thatched longhouse adjacent to the castle. John Bateman FitzGerald, 23rd Knight of Glin married Margaretta Maria Fraunceis Gwyn in the 1780s and used her dowry to build a new home in the Georgian style. Later Neo-classical elements were added to the building.

In 1923 a mob of Sinn Féin members attacked the castle.

In 1993 the FitzGeralds decided to turn the castle into a hotel to help pay for the upkeep. The hotel closed in 2008. In 2011 Desmond FitzGerald, 29th Knight of Glin died without a male heir. In 2015 the castle was put up for auction at Christie's by Lady FitzGerald. The castle did not sell in auction. In an effort to keep the castle in the family, it was purchased by Catherine FitzGerald, daughter of the last Knight of Glin, and her husband Dominic West. Today they run the castle as both a family home and as a complete-let venue.

References

External links
Official website

Castles in County Limerick
Country houses in Ireland
FitzGerald dynasty
Georgian architecture in Ireland
Hotels in County Limerick
Neoclassical architecture in Ireland